Om Kalthoum Museum is a biographical museum in Giza, near Cairo, Egypt. The Om Kalthoum Museum is dedicated to Umm Kulthum, or Om Kalthoum, the famous Egyptian singer, songwriter, and actress.

The museum is located in the Monastirli Palace, which dates from 1851.

References

External links

Museums in Cairo
Biographical museums in Egypt